Iniminimagimo was a French language children's television show made in Quebec. It played in the late 1980s. Each episode featured a classic fairy tale played by the same cast.

Script writers for the series included Linda Wilscam, Marie-Francine Hébert, Maryse Pelletier and Claude Roussin. The show itself is made of 40 episodes: 

 Aladdin & the Magic Lamp
 Alibaba & the Forty Thieves
 Little Baja the Gypsy
 Bluebeard
 Snow-white & the Seven Dwarfs
 Goldilocks & the Three Bears
 Bouki the little hyena
 Cinderella
 The Fisherman & the Golden Fish
 Hansel & Gretel
 There Was a Dog
 Jack & the Beanstalk
 Josée & the Green Mermaid
 Katia & the Devil
 The Spirit in the Bottle 
 The Tale of Aoyagi
 The Sleeping Beauty
 Beauty & the Beast
 The Little Matchgirl
 The Table, the Ass and the Stick
 The Princess & the Pea
 The Frog Prince
 King Thrushbeard
 Puss-in-Boots
 The Devil with Three Golden Hairs
 The Selfish Giant
 The Pied Piper of Hamelin
 The Tortoise & the Hare
 Little-Red-Riding-Hood
 The Nightingale
 The Forty Dragons
 The Emperor's New Clothes
 The King's Rabbits
 The Three Little Pigs
 The Three Feathers
 Donkey-skin
 Little Sun & Little Goldenstar
 Pinocchio
 Riquet of the Tuft
 Vassilissa the Beautiful

References 

Television shows filmed in Quebec
1980s Canadian children's television series